Borisoglebsky (masculine), Borisoglebskaya (feminine), or Borisoglebskoye (neuter) may refer to:
Borisoglebsky District, name of several districts in Russia
Borisoglebsky Urban Okrug, the administrative division and the municipal formation which the town of Borisoglebsk, Voronezh Oblast, Russia, is incorporated as
Borisoglebsky (inhabited locality) (Borisoglebskaya, Borisoglebskoye), name of several inhabited localities in Russia
Borisoglebskoye airfield, an airfield in the Republic of Tatarstan, Russia